Black Tuesday (October 29, 1929) was the highest trading volume day of the Wall Street Crash of 1929 on the New York Stock Exchange.

Black Tuesday may also refer to:
Black Tuesday (film), a 1954 film starring Edward G. Robinson
Black Tuesday (1912), on which a union conflict in New Zealand led to the death of Fred Evans
Black Tuesday (1931), on which the Estevan Riot took place in Estevan, Saskatchewan
Black Tuesday (1967), a day of devastating bushfires in the Australian state of Tasmania
Black Monday (1987) or Black Tuesday (due to time-zone differences), the largest one-day percentage decline in recorded stock market history
Tuesday, September 11, 2001, the day of the September 11 attacks on the World Trade Center in New York City, the Pentagon in Arlington, Virginia, and a field in Shanksville, Pennsylvania
Black Tuesday (2005), the day of a devastating bushfire on the Eyre Peninsula in South Australia
 Black Tuesday, an Imperial Stout brewed by The Bruery

See also
 Bloody Tuesday (disambiguation)